SciEngines GmbH is a privately owned company founded 2007 as a spin-off of the COPACOBANA project by the Universities of Bochum and Kiel, both in Germany. The project intended to create a platform for an affordable Custom hardware attack. COPACOBANA is a massively-parallel reconfigurable computer. It can be utilized to perform a so-called Brute force attack to recover DES encrypted data.  It consists of 120 commercially available, reconfigurable integrated circuits (FPGAs). These Xilinx Spartan3-1000 run in parallel, and create a massively parallel system.  Since 2007, SciEngines GmbH has enhanced and developed successors of COPACOBANA. Furthermore, the COPACOBANA has become a well known reference platform for cryptanalysis and  custom hardware based attacks to symmetric, asymmetric cyphers and stream ciphers. 2008 attacks against A5/1 stream cipher an encryption system been used to encrypt voice streams in GSM have been published as the first known real world attack utilizing off-the-shelf custom hardware.

They introduced in 2008 their RIVYERA S3-5000 enhancing the performance of the computer dramatically via using 128 Spartan-3 5000's. Currently SciEngines RIVYERA holds the record in brute-force breaking DES utilizing 128 Spartan-3 5000 FPGAs.  Current systems provide a unique density of up to 256 Spartan-6 FPGAs per single system enabling scientific utilization beyond the field of cryptanalysis, like bioinformatics.

2006 original developers of the COPACOBANA form the company
2007 introduction of the COPACOBANA (Copacobana S3-1000) as a [COTS]
2007 first demonstration of COPACOBANA 5000 
2008 they introduced RIVYERA S3-5000, the direct successor of COPACOBANA 5000 and COPACOBANA. The RIVYERA architecture introduced a new high performance optimized bus system and a fully API encapsulated communication framework.
2008 demonstration of the COPACOBANA V4-SX35, a 128 Virtex-4 SX35 FPGA cluster (COPACOBANA shared bus architecture)
2008 introduction of the RIVYERA V4-SX35, a 128 Virtex-4 SX35 FPGA cluster (RIVYERA HPC architecture)
2009 they introduced RIVYERA S6-LX150.
2011 they introduced 256 User usable FPGAs per RIVYERA S6-LX150 computer.

Providing a standard off-the-shelf Intel CPU and mainboard integrated into the FPGA computer RIVYERA systems allow to execute most standard code without modifications. SciEngines aims that programmers only have to focus on porting the most time-consuming 5% of their code to the FPGA. Therefore, they bundle an Eclipse like development environment which allows code implementation in hardware based implementation languages e.g. VHDL, Verilog as well as in C based languages. An Application Programming Interface in C, C++, Java and Fortran allow scientists and programmers to adopt their code to benefit from an application-specific hardware architecture.

References

CLC bio and SciEngines collaborate on 188x acceleration of BLAST
www.sciengines.com (Official site)
www.copacobana.org

Further reading
 Lars Wienbrandt, Bioinformatics Applications on the FPGA-based High-Performance Computer RIVYERA, in "High Performance Computing Using FPGAs" edited by Wim Vanderbauwhede, Khaled Benkrid, Springer, 2013, .
 Tim Güneysu, Timo Kasper, Martin Novotný, Christof Paar, Lars Wienbrandt, and Ralf Zimmermann, High-Performance Cryptanalysis on RIVYERA and COPACOBANA Computing Systems, in "High Performance Computing Using FPGAs" edited by Wim Vanderbauwhede, Khaled Benkrid, Springer, 2013, .
 Ayman Abbas, Claas Anders Rathje, Lars Wienbrandt, and Manfred Schimmler, Dictionary Attack on TrueCrypt with RIVYERA S3-5000, 2012 IEEE 18th International Conference on Parallel and Distributed Systems (ICPADS), Dec 2012, pp. 93–100.
 Florian Schatz, Lars Wienbrandt, and Manfred Schimmler, Probability model for boundaries of short-read sequencing, 2012 International Conference on Advances in Computing and Communications (ICACC), Aug 2012, pp. 223–228. (best paper award)
 Christoph Starke, Vasco Grossmann, Lars Wienbrandt, and Manfred Schimmler, An FPGA implementation of an Investment Strategy Processor, Procedia Computer Science, vol. 9, 2012, pp. 1880–1889.
 Lars Wienbrandt, Daniel Siebert, and Manfred Schimmler, Improvement of BLASTp on the FPGA-Based High-Performance Computer RIVYERA, Lecture Notes in Computer Science, vol. 7292, 2012, pp. 275–286.
 Christoph Starke, Vasco Grossmann, Lars Wienbrandt, Sven Koschnicke, John Carstens, and Manfred Schimmler, Optimizing Investment Strategies with the Reconfigurable Hardware Platform RIVYERA, International Journal of Reconfigurable Computing, vol. 2012, 10 pages.
 Lars Wienbrandt, Stefan Baumgart, Jost Bissel, Florian Schatz, and Manfred Schimmler, Massively parallel FPGA-based implementation of BLASTp with the two-hit method, Procedia Computer Science, vol. 4, 2011, pp. 1967–1976.
 Lars Wienbrandt, Hardware implementation and massive parallelization of BLAST, Invited talk: Workshop on Theoretical Biology, Max-Planck-Institute for Evolutionary Biology, Plön 2011.
 Lars Wienbrandt, and Manfred Schimmler, Collecting Statistical Information in DNA Sequences for the Detection of Special Motifs, Proceedings of BIOCOMP2010, 2010, pp. 274–278.
 Manfred Schimmler, Lars Wienbrandt, Tim Güneysu, and Jost Bissel, COPACOBANA: A Massively Parallel FPGA-Based Computer Architecture, in "Bioinformatics: High Performance Parallel Computer Architectures" edited by Bertil Schmidt, CRC Press, 2010, .
 Lars Wienbrandt, Stefan Baumgart, Jost Bissel, Carol May Yen Yeo, and Manfred Schimmler, Using the reconfigurable massively parallel architecture COPACOBANA 5000 for applications in bioinformatics, Procedia Computer Science, vol. 1 (1), 2010, pp. 1027–1034.
 Lars Wienbrandt, Massiv parallelisierte DNA-Motivsuche auf COPACOBANA - Hardware-Implementierung in VHDL und Effizienzvergleich mit einem Standard-PC, Diplomarbeit, Dezember 2008
 Jan Schröder, Lars Wienbrandt, Gerd Pfeiffer, and Manfred Schimmler, Massively Parallelized DNA Motif Search on the Reconfigurable Hardware Platform COPACOBANA, Proceedings of the Third IAPR International Conference on Pattern Recognition in Bioinformatics (PRIB2008), 2008, pp. 436–447.
 S. Baumgart, COPACOBANA RIVYERA a feasible Custom Hardware Attacks, oder der Angriff auf moderne Verschlüsselungsverfahren mittels roher Gewalt, esproject conference (23. - 24.11.2010 Berlin)
 S. Baumgart, Emerging Architectures to Massively Reconfigurable Computing Plattforms and their Applications, JCRA 2010 - Reconfigurable Computing and Applications Conference, (8th-10th Sep. Valencia, Spain)
 G. Pfeiffer, S. Baumgart, J. Schröder, M. Schimmler, A Massively Parallel Architecture for Bioinformatics, ICCS 2009 - International Conference on Computational Science (9th International Conference Baton Rouge, LA, USA, May 25–27, 2009)
 S. Baumgart, Using Emerging Parallel Architectures for Computational Science, ICCS 2009 - International Conference on Computational Science (9th International Conference Baton Rouge, LA, USA, May 25–27, 2009)

Supercomputers
Reconfigurable computing
Cryptographic attacks
Cryptography companies